Grevillea elbertii is a tree species in the family Proteaceae. It is endemic to Sulawesi in Indonesia. It has green flowers which appear in October in the species' native range. The species was first formally described by botanist Hermann Otto Sleumer  in Blumea in 1955.

References

elbertii
Endemic flora of Sulawesi
Trees of Sulawesi